Mansfield Street may refer to:

Mansfield Street, Montreal, Canada
Mansfield Street, Karachi, Pakistan
Mansfield Street, London, England